The Ministry of Textiles is an Indian government national agency responsible for the formulation of policy, planning, development, export promotion and regulation of the textile industry in India. This includes all natural, artificial, and cellulosic fibers that go into the making of textiles, clothing and Handicrafts.

The current Minister of Textiles is Piyush Goyal.

Main functions of the Ministry 
Textile Policy & Coordination  
Man-made Fibre/ Filament Yarn Industry  
Cotton Textile Industry  
Jute Industry  
Silk and Silk Textile Industry  
Wool & Woollen Industry  
Decentralised Powerloom Sector  
Export Promotion  
Planning & Economic Analysis

Organizations

Attached Offices 
 Office of the Development Commissioner for Hand-looms
 Office of the Development Commissioner for Handicrafts

Subordinate Offices 
 Office of the Textile Commissioner
 Office of the Jute Commissioner

Central Public Sector Undertakings (CPSUs)
National Textile Corporation Ltd. (NTC)
British India Corporation Ltd. (BIC)
Cotton Corporation Of India Ltd. (CCI)
Jute Corporation of India  (JCI) 
 National Jute Manufactures Corporation Limited (NJMC) 
Central Cottage Industries Corporation (CCIC)
National Handloom Development Corporation Ltd. (NHDC)

Statutory Bodies
Jute Manufacturers Development Council
Central Silk Board
Textile Committee
 Commissioner of Payments
 National Institute of Fashion Technology (NIFT)

Advisory Bodies 
 Development Council for Textile Industry 
 Co-ordination Council for Textile Research Associations   
 Co-ordination Committee of Textiles Export Promotion Council

Autonomous Bodies 
Central Wool Development Board
National Institute of Fashion Technology (NIFT)
Sardar Vallabhbhai Patel International School of Textiles & Management, Coimbatore
 Indian Institutes of Handloom Technology

List of Ministers of Textiles

List of Ministers of State

National Handlooms & Handicrafts Museum 

National Handicrafts and Handlooms Museum, New Delhi was set up at Pragati Maidan, New Delhi under the administrative control of the Ministry of Textiles. The Museum is a structured village complex consisting of 15 structures representing village dwellings, courtyards and shrines from different states spread over an area of 5 hectares. The museum collection contains about 20,000 most rare and distinctive pieces reflecting the continuing tradition of Indian craftsmen.

References

External links
 Ministry of Textiles - Official website

 
T
Textile industry of India